The following outline is provided as an overview of and topical guide to technology: collection of tools, including machinery, modifications, arrangements and procedures used by humans. Engineering is the discipline that seeks to study and design new technology. Technologies significantly affect human as well as other animal species' ability to control and adapt to their natural environments.

Components of technology
 
 
 
 
 
 
 
 
 
 
 
 
 
 
 
 
 
 Man-made

Branches of technology 

 Aerospace – flight or transport above the surface of the Earth.
 Space exploration – the physical investigation of the space more than 100 km above the Earth by either crewed or uncrewed spacecraft.
 General aviation
 Aeronautics
 Astronautics
 Aerospace engineering
 Applied physics – physics which is intended for a particular technological or practical use. It is usually considered as a bridge or a connection between "pure" physics and engineering.
 Agriculture – cultivation of plants, animals, and other living organisms.
 Fishing – activity of trying to catch fish. Fish are normally caught in the wild. Techniques for catching fish include hand gathering, spearing, netting, angling and trapping.
 Fisheries – a fishery is an entity engaged in raising or harvesting fish which is determined by some authority to be a fishery. According to the FAO, a fishery is typically defined in terms of the "people involved, species or type of fish, area of water or seabed, method of fishing, class of boats, purpose of the activities or a combination of the foregoing features".
 Fishing industry –  industry or activity concerned with taking, culturing, processing, preserving, storing, transporting, marketing or selling fish or fish products. It is defined by the FAO as including recreational, subsistence and commercial fishing, and the harvesting, processing, and marketing sectors.
 Forestry – art and science of tree resources, including plantations and natural stands. The main goal of forestry is to create and implement systems that allow forests to continue a sustainable provision of environmental supplies and services.
 Organic gardening and farming
 Sustainable agriculture
 Communication
 Books
 Telecommunication – the transfer of information at a distance, including signaling, telegraphy, telephony, telemetry, radio, television, and data communications.
 Radio – Aural or encoded telecommunications.
 Internet – the global system of interconnected computer networks that use the standard Internet Protocol Suite (TCP/IP).
 Technology of television
 Television broadcasting – Visual and aural telecommunications.
 Computing – any goal-oriented activity requiring, benefiting from, or creating computers. Computing includes designing and building hardware and software systems; processing, structuring, and managing various kinds of information; doing scientific research on and with computers; making computer systems behave intelligently; creating and using communications and entertainment media; and more.
 Computer engineering –  discipline that integrates several fields of electrical engineering and computer science required to develop computer systems, from designing individual microprocessors, personal computers, and supercomputers, to circuit design.
 Computers – general purpose devices that can be programmed to carry out a finite set of arithmetic or logical operations. Since a sequence of operations can be readily changed, computers can solve more than one kind of problem.
 Computer science – the study of the theoretical foundations of information and computation and of practical techniques for their implementation and application in computer systems.
 Artificial intelligence – intelligence of machines and the branch of computer science that aims to create it.
 Natural language processing
 Object recognition – in computer vision, this is the task of finding a given object in an image or video sequence.
 Cryptography – the technology to secure communications in the presence of third parties.
 Human-computer interaction
 Information technology – the acquisition, processing, storage and dissemination of vocal, pictorial, textual and numerical information by a microelectronics-based combination of computing and telecommunications.
 Software engineering – the systematic approach to the development, operation, maintenance, and retirement of computer software.
 Programming – the process of designing, writing, testing, debugging, and maintaining the source code of computer programs.
 Software development – development of a software product, which entails computer programming (process of writing and maintaining the source code), but also encompasses a planned and structured process from the conception of the desired software to its final manifestation.
 Web design and web development
 Software – one or more computer programs and data held in the storage of the computer for one or more purposes. In other words, software is a set of programs, procedures, algorithms and its documentation concerned with the operation of a data processing system.
 Free software – software that can be used, studied, and modified without restriction.
 Search engines – information retrieval systems designed to help find information stored on a computer system.
 Internet – the global system of interconnected computer networks that use the standard Internet Protocol Suite (TCP/IP).
 World Wide Web
 Computer industry
 Apple Inc. – manufacturer and retailer of computers, hand-held computing devices, and related products and services.
 Google – Google Inc. and its Internet services including Google Search.
 Construction – building or assembly of any physical structure.
 Design – the art and science of creating the abstract form and function for an object or environment.
 Architecture – the art and science of designing buildings.
 Electronics – Electronics comprises the physics, engineering, technology and applications that deal with the emission, flow and control of electrons in vacuum and matter.
 Energy – In physics, energy is the quantitative property that must be transferred to an object in order to perform work on, or to heat, the object.
Energy development – ongoing effort to provide abundant, efficient, and accessible energy resources through knowledge, skills, and construction.
 Energy storage – the storage of a form of energy that can then be used later.
 Nuclear technology – the technology and application of the spontaneous and induced reactions of atomic nuclei.
 Wind energy – wind energy is the use of wind to provide the mechanical power through wind turbines to turn electric generators and traditionally to do other work, like milling or pumping.
 Solar energy – Solar energy is radiant light and heat from the Sun that is harnessed using a range of ever-evolving technologies such as solar heating, photovoltaics, solar thermal energy, solar architecture, molten salt power plants and artificial photosynthesis.
 Engineering – the application of science, mathematics, and technology to produce useful goods and systems.
Chemical engineering – the technology and application of chemical processes to produce useful materials.
 Computer engineering – Computer engineering (CE) is a branch of engineering that integrates several fields of computer science and electronic engineering required to develop computer hardware and software.
 Control engineering – Control engineering or control systems engineering is an engineering discipline that applies automatic control theory to design systems with desired behaviors in control environments.
 Electrical engineering – the technology and application of electromagnetism, including electricity, electronics, telecommunications, computers, electric power, magnetics, and optics.
 Climate engineering –  the large-scale manipulation of a specific process central to controlling Earth’s climate for the purpose of obtaining a specific benefit.
 Software engineering – the technology and application of a systematic approach to the development, operation, maintenance, and retirement of computer software.
 Firefighting – act of extinguishing fires. A firefighter fights fires to prevent destruction of life, property and the environment. Firefighting is a professional technical skill.
 Forensic science – application of a broad spectrum of sciences to answer questions of interest to a legal system. This may be in relation to a crime or a civil action.
 Health
 Biotechnology – applied biology that involves the use of living organisms and bioprocesses in engineering, technology, medicine and other fields requiring bioproducts.
 Ergonomics – the study of designing equipment and devices that fit the human body, its movements, and its cognitive abilities.
 Hydrology – The study of the movement, distribution, and quality of water on Earth and other planets, including the hydrologic cycle, water resources and environmental watershed sustainability.
 Industry – production of an economic good or service.
 Automation – use of machinery to replace human labor.
 Industrial machinery
 Machines – devices that perform or assist in performing useful work.
 Manufacturing – use of machines, tools and labor to produce goods for use or sale. The term may refer to a range of human activity, from handicraft to high tech, but is most commonly applied to industrial production, in which raw materials are transformed into finished goods on a large scale.
 Robotics – deals with the design, construction, operation, structural disposition, manufacture and application of robots.
 Object recognition
 Information science
 Cartography – the study and practice of making maps. Combining science, aesthetics, and technique, cartography builds on the premise that reality can be modeled in ways that communicate spatial information effectively.
 Library science – technology related to libraries and the information fields.
 Military science – the study of the technique, psychology, practice and other phenomena which constitute war and armed conflict.
 Mining – extraction of mineral resources from the earth.
 Nanotechnology – The study of manipulating matter on an atomic and molecular scale. Generally, nanotechnology deals with structures sized between 1 and 100 nanometre in at least one dimension, and involves developing materials or devices possessing at least one dimension within that size.
 Prehistoric technology – technologies that emerged before recorded history (i.e., before the development of writing).
 Quantum technology 
 Sustainability – capacity to endure. In ecology, the word describes how biological systems remain diverse and productive over time. Long-lived and healthy wetlands and forests are examples of sustainable biological systems. For humans, sustainability is the potential for long-term maintenance of well being, which has environmental, economic, and social dimensions.
 Transport – the transfer of people or things from one place to another.
 Rail transport –  means of conveyance of passengers and goods by way of wheeled vehicles running on rail tracks consisting of steel rails installed on sleepers/ties and ballast.
 Vehicles – mechanical devices for transporting people or things.
 Automobiles – human-guided powered land-vehicles.
 Bicycles – human-powered land-vehicles with two or more wheels.
 Motorcycles – single-track, engine-powered, motor vehicles. They are also called motorbikes, bikes, or cycles.
 Vehicle components
 Tires – ring-shaped coverings that fit around wheel rims

Technology by region 

 Science and technology in Africa
 Science and technology in Algeria
 Science and technology in Angola
 Science and technology in Morocco 
 Science and technology in South Africa
 Science and technology in Asia
 Science and technology in Bangladesh 
 Science and technology in China 
 Science and technology in India 
 Science and technology in Indonesia 
 Science and technology in Iran 
 Science and technology in Israel 
 Science and technology in Japan 
 Science and technology in Malaysia 
 Science and technology in Pakistan 
 Science and technology in the Philippines 
 Science and technology in Russia 
 Science and technology in Turkey
 Science and technology in Europe
 Science and technology in Albania 
 Science and technology in Belgium 
 Science and technology in Brussels 
 Science and technology in Flanders 
 Science and technology in Wallonia 
 Science and technology in Bulgaria 
 Science and technology in France 
 Science and technology in Germany 
 Science and technology in Hungary 
 Science and technology in Iceland 
 Science and technology in Italy 
 Science and technology in Portugal 
 Science and technology in Romania 
 Science and technology in Russia 
 Science and technology in Spain 
 Science and technology in Switzerland 
 Science and technology in Ukraine 
 Science and technology in the United Kingdom
 Science and technology in North America
 Science and technology in Canada 
 Science and technology in the United States 
 Science and technology in Jamaica
 Science and technology in South America
 Science and technology in Argentina 
 Science and technology in Colombia 
 Science and technology in Venezuela

History of technology 

History of technology
 Timelines of technology Man vs. Technology 
 Technology museum

 History of technology by period 
 Prehistoric technology (outline) 
 Control of fire by early humans
 Ancient technology – c. 800 BCE – 476 CE
 Ancient Egyptian technology
 Ancient Greek technology – c. 800 BCE – 146 BCE
 Ancient Roman technology – c. 753 BCE – 476 CE
 Science and technology of the Han dynasty – 206 BCE – 220 CE
 Science and technology of the Tang dynasty – 618–907 
 Science and technology of the Song dynasty – 960–1279 CE
 Medieval technology – 5th to 15th century
 Byzantine technology – 5th to 15th century
 Islamic Golden Age – 8th to 13th century
 Science and technology in the Ottoman Empire – 14th to 20th century
 Industrial revolution – 18th to 19th century
 Second Industrial Revolution – 1820–1914
 Technology during World War I – 1914–1918
 Technology during World War II – 1939–1945
 Allied technological cooperation during World War II
 American military technology during World War II
 German military technology during World War II
 1970s in science and technology 
 1980s in science and technology 
 1990s in science and technology 
 2000s in science and technology 
 2010s in science and technology

 Technological ages 
 
 
 
 
 
 

 Media about the history of technology 
 Connections – documentary television series and 1978 book ("Connections" based on the series) created, written and presented by science historian James Burke. It took an interdisciplinary approach to the history of science and invention and demonstrated how various discoveries, scientific achievements, and historical world events were built from one another successively in an interconnected way to bring about particular aspects of modern technology. There were 3 seasons produced, and they aired in 1978, 1994, and 1997. 
 The Day the Universe Changed – documentary television series written and presented by science historian James Burke, originally broadcast in 1985 by the BBC. The series' primary focus is on the effect of advances in science and technology on western society in its philosophical aspects. Ran for one season, in 1986.

 History of technology by region 
 History of science and technology in the Mediterranean
 Ancient Greek technology
 Ancient Roman technology
 Timeline of Polish science and technology
 History of science and technology in Africa
 History of science and technology in Asia
 History of science and technology in China
 Science and technology of the Han dynasty
 Science and technology of the Tang dynasty
 Science and technology of the Song dynasty
 History of science and technology in the People's Republic of China
 History of science and technology in the Indian subcontinent
 Science and technology in ancient India
 History of science and technology in Korea
 Science and Technology in the Ottoman Empire
 Science and technology in the Soviet Union
 History of science and technology in North America
 United States technological and industrial history
 History of science and technology in Mexico
 Technological and industrial history of Canada
 Technological and industrial history of 20th-century Canada
 Technological and industrial history of 21st-century Canada
 Technological and industrial history of the People's Republic of China
 Technological and industrial history of the United States

 History of technology by field 

 History of invention
 History of aerospace
 History of artificial intelligence
 History of agriculture
 History of agricultural science
 History of architecture, timeline
 History of biotechnology
 History of cartography
 History of chemical engineering
 History of communication
 History of computing, timeline
 History of computer science
 History of computing hardware
 History of the graphical user interface
 History of hypertext, timeline
 History of the Internet, Internet phenomena
 History of the World Wide Web
 History of operating systems
 History of programming languages, timeline
 History of software engineering
 History of electrical engineering
 History of energy development
 History of engineering
 History of industry
 History of library and information science
 History of microscopy
 History of manufacturing
 History of the factory
 History of mass production
 History of materials science, timeline
 History of measurement
 History of medicine
 History of motor and engine technology
 History of military science
 History of transport, timeline
 History of biotechnology
 Timeline of biotechnology
 History of display technology
 History of film technology
 History of information technology auditing
 History of military technology
 History of nanotechnology
 History of science and technology
 History of web syndication technology
 Timeline of agriculture and food technology
 Timeline of clothing and textiles technology
 Timeline of communication technology
 Timeline of diving technology
 Timeline of heat engine technology
 Timeline of hypertext technology
 Timeline of lighting technology
 Timeline of low-temperature technology
 Timeline of materials technology
 Timeline of medicine and medical technology
 Timeline of microscope technology
 Timeline of motor and engine technology
 Timeline of particle physics technology
 Timeline of photography technology
 Timeline of rocket and missile technology
 Timeline of telescope technology
 Timeline of telescopes, observatories, and observing technology
 Timeline of temperature and pressure measurement technology
 Timeline of time measurement technology
 Timeline of transportation technology

 Hypothetical technology 
Potential technology of the future includes:

Hypothetical technology
 Femtotechnology – hypothetical term used in reference to structuring of matter on the scale of a femtometer, which is 10−15 m. This is a smaller scale in comparison to nanotechnology and picotechnology which refer to 10−9 m and 10−12 m respectively. Work in the femtometer range involves manipulation of excited energy states within atomic nuclei (see nuclear isomer) to produce metastable (or otherwise stabilized) states with unusual properties.

 Philosophy of technology 

 
  
  
  
  
  
  
  
  
  
  
  
  
 
  
  
  
  
  
  
 

 Management of technology 

  
 
  
  
  
  
  
 
 

Advancement of technology
 
 
 
 
 
 
 
 
 
 
 

 Politics of technology 
Politics and technology
 AI takeover
 Accelerating change
 Format war
 Information privacy
 IT law
 PEST analysis
 Robot rights
 Technological singularity
 Technological sovereignty

 Economics of technology 
 Energy accounting
 Nanosocialism
 Post-scarcity economy
 Technocracy
 Technocapitalism
 Technological diffusion
 Technology acceptance model
 Technology lifecycle
 Technology transfer

 Technology education 

 Technology education
 Technology museums 
 

 Technology organizations 
 Science and technology think tanks 

 Applied Biomathematics
 Battelle Memorial Institute
 Cicada 3301
 Council for Scientific and Industrial Research
 Edge Foundation, Inc.
 Eudoxa
 Federation of American Scientists
 Free Software Foundation
 GTRI Office of Policy Analysis and Research
 Information Technology and Innovation Foundation
 Institute for Science and International Security
 Institute for the Encouragement of Scientific Research and Innovation of Brussels
 Keck Institute for Space Studies
 Kestrel Institute
 Malaysian Industry-Government Group for High Technology
 Moore Center for Theoretical Cosmology and Physics
 Pakistan Council of Scientific and Industrial Research
 Piratbyrån
 RAND Corporation
 Regional Center for Renewable Energy and Energy Efficiency
 Res4Med
 Richard Dawkins Foundation for Reason and Science
 Swecha
 Wau Holland Foundation

 Technology media 
 For historical treatments, see Media about the history of technology, above Technology journalism

 Books on technology 
 Engines of Creation Technology periodicals 
 Engadget TechCrunch Wired Websites 

 The Verge Fictional technology 
Fictional technology
 In Death technology
 Technology in Star Trek
 Technology in Star Wars
 Technology of Robotech
 List of technology in the Dune universe

 Persons influential in technology 

 List of engineers
 List of inventors
 List of scientists

 See also 

 Outline of applied science

 Further reading 

 
 Huesemann, M.H., and J.A. Huesemann (2011). Technofix: Why Technology Won’t Save Us or the Environment, New Society Publishers, .
 .
 Kevin Kelly. What Technology Wants. New York, Viking Press, 14 October 2010, hardcover, 416 pages. 
 Mumford, Lewis. (2010). Technics and Civilization. University of Chicago Press, .
 Rhodes, Richard. (2000). Visions of Technology: A Century of Vital Debate about Machines, Systems, and the Human World. Simon & Schuster, .
 Teich, A.H. (2008). Technology and the Future. Wadsworth Publishing, 11th edition, .
 Wright, R.T. (2008). Technology. Goodheart-Wilcox Company, 5th edition, .

 References 

 External links 

 Technology news

 BBC on technology
 Bloomberg on technology
 MIT Technology Review
 New York Times technology section
 Wired

 Miscellaneous topics 

 Note: these topics need to be placed in the outline above. Some may be irrelevant and those should be removed. New sections may be needed in the outline to provide a suitable place for some of these items. Annotations by way of short descriptions may help decide where a link should go.''

  
  
  
  
  
  
  
  
  
  
  
  
  
  
  
  
  
  
  
  
  
  
  
  
  
  
  
  
  
  
  
  
  
  
  
  
  
  
  application of modern information technology in activities related to dance: in dance education, choreography, performance, and research. 
  
  
  
  
  
  
  
  
  
  
  
  
  
  
  
  
  
  
  
  
  
  
  
  
  
  
  
  
  
  
  
  
  
  
  
  
  
  
  
  
  
  
  
  
  
  
  
  
  
  
  
  
  
  
  
   
  
  
  
  
  
  
  
  
  
  
  
  
  
  
  
  
  
  
  
  
  
  
  
  
  
  
  
  
  
  
  
  
  
  
  
  
  
  
  
  
  
  
  
  
  
  
  
  
  
  
  
  
  
  
  
  
  
  
  
  
  
  
  
  
  
  
  
  
  
  
  
  
  
  
  
  
  
  
  
  
  
  
  
  
  
  
  
  
  
  
  
  
  
 
  
  
  
  
  
  
  
  
  
  
  
  
  
  
  
 
  
  
  
  
  
  
   
  
  
  
  
  
  
  
  
  
  
  
  
  
  
  
  
  
  
  
  
  
  
  
  
  
  
  
  
  
  
  
  
  
  
  
  
  
  
  
  
  
  
  
  
  
  
  
  
  
  
  
  
  
  
  
  
  
  
  
  
  
  
  
  
  
  
  
  
  
  
  
  
  
  
  
  
  
  
  
  
  
  
  
  
  
  
  
  
  
  
  
  
  
  
  
  
  
  
  
  
  
  
  
  
  
  
  
  
  
  
  
  
  
  
  
  
  
  
  
  
  
 
 
 
 
 
 
 
 
 
 
 
 
 
 
 
 
 
 
 
 
 
 
 
 Technofile
 
 
 
 
 
 
 
 
 
 
 
 
 
 
 
 
 
 
 
 
 
 
 
 
 
 
 

Technology
Technology
Technology-related lists